Mike Oliver (born November 27, 1973 in Victoria, British Columbia) is a field hockey player from Canada.

Oliver was selected for the first time in the Men's National Team  in 2001 for the World Cup Qualifier in Scotland. The striker, employed as an air traffic controller, scored his first goal in his first cap against Belgium with a few minutes of playing time left (final score: 1-1).

International senior competitions
 2001 – World Cup Qualifying Tournament, Edinburgh (8th)
 2002 – Commonwealth Games, Manchester (6th)
 2003 – Pan American Games, Santo Domingo (2nd)
 2004 – Olympic Qualifying Tournament, Madrid (11th)

References 

1973 births
Living people
Field hockey players from Victoria, British Columbia
Canadian male field hockey players